Edward Donno (July 24, 1935October 19, 2014) was an American actor and stunt performer with a career that spanned almost 50 years.

Born in Philadelphia, Pennsylvania, Donno was originally a singer before traveling to Texas in the 1960s to visit a friend on the set of The Alamo, where he acquired a role as an extra. He was befriended by John Wayne in the process, and went on to do stunts on several of his films, including McLintock! and The Green Berets. 

Donno performed stunts in for many films and TV show, including the films Scarface, Beverly Hills Cop, The Untouchables, Die Hard 2, Point Break, The Rock, Godzilla, Daredevil and The 40-Year-Old Virgin, as well as the TV shows The A-Team, 24, Supernatural, Californication and the Star Trek movies The Wrath of Khan, The Search for Spock and First Contact. He was John Belushi's stunt double for The Blues Brothers. 

Donno died on October 19, 2014.

Filmography
As an actor.

References

External links 

1935 births
2014 deaths
Male actors from Philadelphia
American stunt performers